The 2009 Pickup Truck Racing season was the 13th Pickup Truck Racing season.

Race Calendar

Championship Standings 

Pickup Truck Racing (series)